Bob Wieland is a Vietnam War veteran who lost his legs to a mortar mine in 1969.  After recovering from his injuries he was inspired to become a marathon participant.  Over his lifetime he has finished many marathons, often taking multiple days to finish.  He is the only double amputee to finish the difficult Kona, Hawaii Ironman race without a wheelchair. He "ran" across America on his hands, taking three years, eight months, and six days to travel from coast to coast.

Early life
Growing up in Wisconsin, Wieland attended the University of Wisconsin.  A talented baseball player, he was negotiating a deal with the Philadelphia Phillies when he decided to join the Army as a combat medic.

Vietnam
In Vietnam in June 1969, his squad walked into a mine field.  When a member of his unit stepped on a booby-trapped mortar, Wieland rushed to give first aid but he, too, stepped on an 82mm buried mortar, a round designed to destroy tanks. It severely damaged his legs; they had to be amputated above the knee. In a letter to his parents after his accident, he wrote:

Wieland likes to say of that day, "My legs went one direction, my life another."

Recovery and NFL career
After recovering from his injuries, he enrolled at California State University, Los Angeles majoring in education.  After college, he joined the Green Bay Packers as a strength coach.

Marathons
In November 1986 he completed the New York City Marathon, taking four days to complete the  race.  He "ran" across America on his hands, taking three years, eight months, and six days to travel from coast to coast and raise money for Vietnam war veterans. In 1988 at 41, he finished the Los Angeles Marathon, taking 74.5 hours to finish the  race.  He started the race a day earlier than everyone else and finished two days after the last runner had crossed the finish line.

Wieland was a guest on 100 Huntley Street.

On August 23, 2012, Wieland announced his plans for the Celebrate America Tour starting in January 2013.  Over the next 5 years, his plans are to visit all 50 States in the US, extending a challenge to do a measure more and inspire others! He will be speaking at conventions, corporate meetings, military bases, universities, high schools and churches.

Actor

In the 1988–1990 TV series Sonny Spoon, Wieland played the character of Johnny Skates.

See also

Linda Down

References

Sources

External links
 Bob Wieland inspirational speaker
 

Living people
People from Greenfield, Wisconsin
American humanitarians
American amputees
American disabled sportspeople
California State University, Los Angeles alumni
University of Wisconsin–Madison alumni
United States Army personnel of the Vietnam War
United States Army soldiers
Year of birth missing (living people)